Neocryphoeca is a genus of North American araneomorph spiders in the family Cybaeidae, and was first described by V. D. Roth in 1970.  it contains only two species, both found in the United States: N. beattyi and N. gertschi. Originally placed with the funnel weavers, it was moved to the Cybaeidae in 1983.

References

Araneomorphae genera
Cybaeidae
Hahniidae
Spiders of the United States